Gail Robinson is a Canadian poet, novelist, and writer for radio.

Born in Delisle, Saskatchewan, Robinson is a graduate of the University of Saskatchewan and the author of four books, including God of the Plains, Coyote the Trickster, Raven the Trickster, and a volume of poetry. She is a regular contributor to both the CBC and BBC radio networks, and has written for NPR in the United States as well.

References

21st-century Canadian novelists
21st-century Canadian poets
Canadian women poets
Canadian women novelists
Canadian radio writers
Women radio writers
Living people
Writers from Saskatchewan
21st-century Canadian women writers
Year of birth missing (living people)